Francis Bernard SL (1663 – 30 June 1731) was an Irish lawyer, politician and judge.

He was the son of Francis Bernard of Castle Mahon and Mary Freke,  daughter of Arthur Freke  of Rathbarry and Dorothy Smyth and sister of Percy Freke. Bernard sat as Member of Parliament (MP) in the Irish House of Commons. He represented Clonakilty between 1692 and 1695 and subsequently Bandonbridge between 1695 and 1727. In politics he was described as a "furious Tory", as were his wife's father Stephen Ludlow and her sister Lady Rogerson (his wife's political views are less clear). He was appointed Solicitor-General for Ireland in 1711, a post he held until 1714, and Prime Serjeant in 1724. Two years later he became a Judge of the Irish Court of Common Pleas, despite holding what were by then definitely the "wrong"  political opinions.

In 1693, Bernard married Alice Ludlow, daughter of Stephen Ludlow M.P, of Ardsallagh, County Meath and his wife Alice Lachard of Wales. They had six sons and one daughter, Elizabeth (1703-1743), who married first James Caulfeild, 3rd Viscount Charlemont, and subsequently Thomas Adderley. His grandson James, son of Major North Ludlow Bernard and his first wife Rose Echlin, inherited  Castle Bernard, the main family residence, from his childless uncle Francis junior. He was the ancestor of the Earls of Bandon. The leading statesman James Caulfeild, 1st Earl of Charlemont was another of Bernard's grandsons.

His death was sudden and unexpected: though close to seventy he had apparently been in good health, and he had been sitting in Court the day before he was found dead in his bed. Alice outlived her husband and died in 1741.

An anonymous elegy praised him extravagantly: "rock of the law and nature's pride". It also suggested that his death was due to overwork.

References

1663 births
1731 deaths
17th-century Irish lawyers
18th-century Irish lawyers
Politicians from County Cork
Irish MPs 1692–1693
Irish MPs 1695–1699
Irish MPs 1703–1713
Irish MPs 1713–1714
Irish MPs 1715–1727
Members of the Parliament of Ireland (pre-1801) for County Cork constituencies
Solicitors-General for Ireland
Serjeants-at-law (Ireland)
18th-century Irish judges